RPP may refer to:

Academic journals 
 Review of Philosophy and Psychology
 Review of Particle Physics, a Particle Data Group publication

Media 
 Grupo RPP, a Peruvian media conglomerate
 Radio Programas del Perú, their news radio station
 RPP FM, an Australian community radio station

Political parties 
 People's Rally for Progress, Djibouti
 Rastriya Prajatantra Party, Nepal
 Reformed Political Party, Netherlands
 Republican People's Party, Turkey

Other uses
 Rate pressure product, in heart medicine
 Registered Professional Planner, a Canadian qualification
 Rho Pi Phi, a professional pharmacy fraternity